Marvin Grégory Edward Torvic (born 5 January 1988) is a French Guianan footballer who plays for Etoile Matoury and the French Guiana national team.

Club career 
Torvic is a graduate of South Aiken High School and Newberry College, South Carolina. He has previously played for FC Lorient reserves in France and US Sinnamary in the French Guiana Championnat National. In February 2013 Torvic signed for Finnish side PS Kemi. In July 2014 he signed for German club TSV 1860 Rosenheim of the fifth-tier Bayernliga.

International career 
Torvic has been capped 9 times for the French Guiana national team. He was a member of the French Guiana 2012 Caribbean Cup squad.

Career statistics 
Scores and results list French Guiana's goal tally first, score column indicates score after each Torvic goal.

References

External links 
 
 

Living people
1988 births
People from Sinnamary
French Guianan footballers
Association football central defenders
French Guiana international footballers
2014 Caribbean Cup players
Divisiones Regionales de Fútbol players
Serie D players
TSV 1860 Rosenheim players
French Guianan expatriate footballers
French expatriate sportspeople in the United States
Expatriate soccer players in the United States
French expatriate sportspeople in Spain
Expatriate footballers in Spain
French expatriate sportspeople in Finland
Expatriate footballers in Finland
French expatriate sportspeople in Germany
Expatriate footballers in Germany